Reiteration is making an iteration again and again. It may refer to:
 Tremolo, a trembling effect in music
 Reiteration, a virtual rule of inference in mathematical logic

See also 
 Reiterate, a GRITS album
 Iteration (disambiguation)
 Repetition (disambiguation)